Results from the 1967 Buenos Aires Grand Prix held at Buenos Aires on January 22, 1967, in the Autódromo Oscar Alfredo Gálvez.The race was the first race for the XVI Temporada Argentina.

Classification

References

Buenos Aires Grand Prix
1967 in motorsport
1967 in Argentine motorsport
January 1967 sports events in South America